Spring Creek is a stream in Putnam, Sullivan and Adair counties of northern Missouri. It is a tributary of the Chariton River.

The stream flows south into northern Sullivan County approximately 3.5 miles northeast of Pollock and continues to the southeast passing under Missouri Route 129 south of Pennville and passes through the Union Ridge Conservation Area and into Adair County. It flows past the community of Stahl and flows parallel to the south side of Missouri Route O past the community of Danforth. The confluence is six miles west of the city of Kirksville.

References

Rivers of Adair County, Missouri
Rivers of Putnam County, Missouri
Rivers of Sullivan County, Missouri
Rivers of Missouri